OPUS is a rechargeable, dual interface (contact/contactless) stored-value smart card using the Calypso Standard and is used by major public transit operators in Greater Montreal and Quebec City, Quebec, Canada. It complies with the ISO/IEC 14443 standard for smartcards, and can be read by smartphones with an NFC antenna.

The name of the card in French, Carte OPUS, is a pun on the word in French for smart cards with embedded chips, carte à puce.

Fares 
An advantage to the smart card compared to the previous system is the seamless integration with other transit networks of neighbouring cities.  Another advantage relates to the speed at which users can access the system. As opposed to the magnetic stripe cards previously in use, the contactless smart card is more user-friendly in that the card does not risk becoming demagnetized and rendered useless, and also does not require patrons to slide the card in a particular way — proximity to the contactless reader will suffice. A disadvantage is that a new card costs $6. The cards expire after four years, and there is no charge for replacements.

One card can contain up to four different kinds of fares. For example, an OPUS card can contain an STM monthly pass, 10 STL tickets, 6 CIT Laurentides tickets, and 2 train tickets for Exo zone 5, or both individual STM tickets and a weekly or monthly pass). Unlike other transit cards, such as Presto (Ontario) and Compass (Metro Vancouver), the OPUS is not a stored-value system. The appropriate fare is deducted when paying at any machine, in a similar fashion to PayPass, and daily, weekly, and monthly passes are used before individual tickets. The main goal behind the creation of this card was to reduce fare evasion in the province's transit systems.

The card is available at various points of sale where local transit fares are currently sold. Re-filling stations can be found at Montreal Metro stations, train stations, and Exo bus terminals, as well as from specified retailers where local transit fares are sold.

Costs to the STM related to the project were approximately $138 million, compared to the original estimated cost of some $100 million. The project was originally supposed to be implemented in 2006.

The OPUS card has been widely criticized for its lack of stored-value capability and being able to only load four types of tickets/passes simultaneously, which significantly reduces the capability and flexibility that would otherwise be gained with a stored-value system.

Rollout phases 
 Q2 2008 – Testing with employees of transit authorities and select groups of testers.
 Q2 2008 – Deployed for users of the RTL only.
 Q4 2008 – Deployed for students on all STM, STL and RTL as well as Exo TRAM users.
 Late Q4 2008 – Deployed for all regular fare users of all three transit authorities as well as Exo TRAM users.
 Q2 2009 – Start of deployment for users of CIT systems.
 Q2 2010 – End of deployment for users of CIT systems.

In preparation for this new step in Montreal's public transportation network, turnstiles that incorporate the reader and vending machines were  installed in Metro stations; buses had previously been fitted with new fare boxes that incorporate the card reader, in order to ensure the uniformity of methods of payment across Montreal’s transit network and that of its suburbs.

Participating transit authorities

See also
 List of smart cards

References

External links
 Official website

Public transport in Quebec
Montreal Metro
Exo (public transit)
Société de transport de Montréal
Contactless smart cards
Fare collection systems in Canada